The 2012–13 Danish 2nd Divisions in the game of football will be divided in two groups of sixteen teams. The two group winners will be promoted to the 2013–14 Danish 1st Division.

Because of an uneven distribution of West and East-teams (divided by the Great Belt), one East-team, BK Søllerød-Vedbæk, was drawn into the West-division.

Participants

East

West

Play-off

Relegation game
Due to the bankruptcy of FC Fyn in the Danish 1st Division an extra spot in the 2013–14 Danish 2nd Divisions will be open. The Dansk Boldspil Union decided that the extra spot was to go to the winner of a play-off game between the two teams in 14th place. The two teams will play promotion game on home and away basis.

First leg

Second leg

References

Danish 2nd Division seasons
3
Danish